Jim Henry Township is an inactive township in Miller County, in the U.S. state of Missouri.

Jim Henry Township was established in 1838, and named after a local Native American tribal leader.

References

Townships in Missouri
Townships in Miller County, Missouri